District 9 is a former urban district (quận) of Ho Chi Minh City, the largest city in Vietnam. As of 2010, the district had a population of 263,486, and an area of 114 km².

District 9 was merged with District 2 and Thủ Đức district to become Thu Duc City on December 9, 2020, by Standing Committee of the National Assembly's approval.

Geographical location

District 9 borders Đồng Nai province to the east, Bình Dương province to the west, District 2 to the south, and Thủ Đức district to the west.

Administration
District 9 consists of 13 wards (phường):
 Phước Long A
 Phước Long B
 Tăng Nhơn Phú A
 Tăng Nhơn Phú B
 Long Trường
 Trường Thạnh
 Phước Bình
 Tân Phú
 Hiệp Phú
 Long Thạnh Mỹ
 Long Bình
 Long Phước
 Phú Hữu

Education

Lycée Français International Marguerite Duras, the French international school, is in Long Bình.

References

Former districts of Vietnam